Lennart Lundell (born 2 August 1956) is a Swedish wrestler. He competed at the 1976 Summer Olympics, the 1980 Summer Olympics and the 1984 Summer Olympics.

References

External links
 

1956 births
Living people
Swedish male sport wrestlers
Olympic wrestlers of Sweden
Wrestlers at the 1976 Summer Olympics
Wrestlers at the 1980 Summer Olympics
Wrestlers at the 1984 Summer Olympics
Sportspeople from Västra Götaland County
20th-century Swedish people